The Lehigh Tunnel is a pair of road tunnels that carries the Pennsylvania Turnpike Northeast Extension (Interstate 476) under Blue Mountain north from U.S. Route 22 in the Lehigh Valley to the Scranton/Wilkes-Barre area between mileposts 70.7 to 71.5.

Description

Construction on this tunnel began on September 21, 1955. Originally a single tunnel that opened to traffic on April 1, 1957, turnpike officials changed the name from the originally-planned "T. J. Evans Tunnel" to the "Lehigh Tunnel" after Evans, chair of the turnpike commission during the time the tunnel was planned, was accused of defrauding the government. The new name also helped to differentiate the Lehigh Tunnel from the existing Blue Mountain Tunnel on the mainline. 

The tunnel was twinned in 1991 to allow two lanes of traffic in each direction. It has an unusual appearance, as the original (northbound) tunnel is rectangular, as it used the older dig-and-blast technique, while the new tube is oval, having been constructed using the New Austrian tunnelling method.

From 1980 to 1996, the Northeast Extension was designated as Pennsylvania Route 9, as opposing traffic faced each other in the single tube prior to the opening of the current southbound tube, and therefore did not qualify for Interstate highway status, which was granted five years after the completion of the southbound tube.

The Lehigh Tunnel crosses the border between Lehigh County and Carbon County. It is the only road tunnel crossed by the Appalachian Trail.

Accidents
Howard M. Sexton, a 70-year-old truck driver from New Jersey, was killed in the southbound Lehigh Tunnel on February 21, 2018 when an electrical conduit broke free from the tunnel's ceiling and fell through the windshield of his truck, striking him in the head. In a preliminary report issued on May 1, 2018, the National Transportation Safety Board revealed that a 10-foot-long section of conduit fell into the path of Sexton's truck after the steel support system for the conduits, which were suspended from the apex of the tunnel arch directly over the travel lanes, failed. The tunnel had last been inspected in 2016, at which time an inspector found evidence of corrosion on several of the steel support straps.

References

External links 

 Pennsylvania Turnpike
 Lehigh Tunnels Twin Tubing 1989-1991

Toll tunnels in Pennsylvania
Transportation buildings and structures in Lehigh County, Pennsylvania
Transportation buildings and structures in Carbon County, Pennsylvania
Pennsylvania Turnpike Commission
Interstate 76 (Ohio–New Jersey)
Road tunnels in Pennsylvania